The Lafayette Flying Corps is a name given to the American volunteer pilots who flew in the French Air Force (Armée de l'Air) during World War I.  It includes the pilots who flew with the bona fide Lafayette Escadrille squadron.

Numbers
The estimations of number of pilots range from 180 to over 300. The generally accepted number of pilots who successfully completed French flight training is 209. Of these, 180 served in combat.

More than 50 Flying Corps personnel (including members of the Lafayette Escadrille) initially served in the Ambulance Corps of the American Field Service.  AFS Surgeon-General Col. Edmund L. Gros, M.D. is credited with initiating the corps.

Casualties and honors
Sixty-nine Corps members died during the war, 42 of them in action against the enemy. The rest were results of disease, accidents, wounds, and suicide. The planes weren't very sturdy, and sometimes guns jammed, too, just when they were needed. The Corps is credited with 159 enemy kills. It amassed 31 Croix de Guerre, and its pilots were awarded seven Médailles militaires and four Légions d'honneur. Eleven of its members were deemed flying aces, claiming five air kills or more. The core squadron suffered nine losses and was credited with 41 victories.

Note
There is frequent confusion between the terms Lafayette Escadrille and Lafayette Flying Corps, exacerbated by the inaccuracies in the movie Flyboys.

Member list
Members
 
Wainwright Abbott
John Russell Adams
Sidney Thayer Allen
Walter K. Appleton, Jr.
Alan Newton Ash (died in service)
Arthur Mills Aten
Jules James Bach
Paul Frank Baer
Benjamin Hester Baird
Horace Clyde Balsley (Lafayette Escadrille)
Leif Norman Barclay (died in service)
Charles Chester Bassett, Jr.
Henry Augustus Batchelor
James Henry Baugham (died in service)
Frank Leaman Baylies (died in service)
James Alexander Bayne (died in service)
Philip Phillips Benny (died in service)
Leo E. Benoît (alias Ernest L. Benway)
Charles John Biddle
Julian Cornell Biddle (died in service)
Stephen Sohier Bigelow (Lafayette Escadrille)
Charles Raymond Blake
Arthur Bluethenthal (died in service)
Pierre de Lagarde Boal
Ellison Converse Bogos
William Vernon Booth, Jr. (died in service)
Clarence Marsh Bosworth
Edgar Jean Bouligny
Algernon Boyesen
Lester Strayer Brady
Ray Claflin Bridgman (Lafayette Escadrille)
Jasper Cornish Brown
Stafford Leighton Brown (died in service)
Everett Timothy Buckley
Thomas Bradley Buffum
Eugene Jacques Bullard, the world's second black military pilot (93 Spad Squadron)
Richard Nixon Bullen
William Graham Bullen
Philip Nelson Bush
Louis Leslie Byers
Andrew Courtney Campbell, Jr. (Lafayette Escadrille, died in service)
Hugh Gordon Campbell
Joseph Maxwell Carrere, Jr.
Thomas Gantz Cassady
Oliver Moulton Chadwick (died in service)
Cyrus Foss Chamberlain (died in service)
Charles Wesley Chapman (died in service)
Victor Chapman (Lafayette Escadrille, died in service)
Louis Charton
Herman Lincoln Chatkoff
Roger Harvey Clapp (died in service)
Caleb James Coatsworth
Edward M. Collier
Phelps Collins (died in service)
James Connelly
Alan Augustus Cook
Linn Palmer Cookson (died in service)
Russell Bracken Corey
Edward Charles Corsi
John Rowell Cotton
Isadore Court
Elliot Christopher Cowdin (Lafayette Escadrille)
Austen Ballard Crehore
Arthur Lawrence Cunningham
Frazier Curtis
Alvan Alexander Cushman
Philip Washburn Davis (died in service)
George Dock, Jr.
Charles Heave Dolan (Lafayette Escadrille)
Robert Louis Donze
James Ralph Doolittle (Lafayette Escadrille, died in service)
Dennis Dowd (died in service)
Meredith Loveland Dowd (died in service)
Sidney Rankin Drew, Jr. (died in service)
John Armstrong Drexel (Lafayette Escadrille)
Nathaniel Edmund Duffy
William Edward Dugan, Jr. (Lafayette Escadrille)
Lowell Richards Dulon
Sherburne Eaton
Stuart Emmet Edgar (died in service)
Donald Herbert Eldredge
Chester Arthur Elliott
Dinsmore Ely (died in service)
John Endicott
Robert Grimshaw Eoff
Edwin Bradley Fairchild
Clarence Henry Faith
Cedric Erroll Fauntleroy
Ian Fearchar Ferguson
Joseph Flynn
Christopher William Ford (Lafayette Escadrille)
Tod Ford
Henry Forster
Eric Anderson Fowler (died in service)
William Frey
Edmond Charles Clinton Genet (Lafayette Escadrille, died in service)
William Wallace Gibson
Joseph Francis Gill
William Smith Gilmore
Clarence Merritt Glover
Reginald G. Gourard
Charles Gossage Grey
Henry Norman Grieb (died in service)
James Murray Grier
David Porter Guest
Andre Gundelach (died in service)
David Wade Guy
James Norman Hall (Lafayette Escadrille)
Weston Bircu Hall (Lafayette Escadrille)
Edgar Guerard Hamilton
Robert Marshall Hanford (died in service)
John B. Harrison, Jr.
Willis Bradley Haviland (Lafayette Escadrille)
John Raynolds Heilbuth
Thomas Moses Hewitt, Jr. (Lafayette Escadrille)
Leslie Matheson Hickson
Dudley Lawrence Hill (Lafayette Escadrille)
Edward Foote Hinkle (Lafayette Escadrille)
Tommy Hitchcock, Jr. (1900–1944), star professional polo player, later assistant air attaché to the US Embassy in Great Britain during World War II
Warren Tucker Hobbs (died in service)
Robert Bentley Hoeber
Milton Whitely Holden
Charles Dabney Horton
Ronald Wood Hoskier (Lafayette Escadrille, died in service)
Edwin A. Hough
John William Huffer
Daniel Elliott Huger
Earl Wayland Hughes
Mark Leslie Hull
Sereno Thorp Jacob
Charles Chouteau Johnson (Lafayette Escadrille)
Harry Firmstune Johnson (died in service)
Archibald Burtt Johnston
Charles Maury Jones
Henry Sweet Jones (Lafayette Escadrille)
Edward David Judd
Lt. Clarence Courtney Kahle (99th Fighter Squadron, A.E.F., Lafayette Flying Corps, died in combat)
Hugo Alden Kenyon
Charles Wayne Kerwood
Charles McIlvaine Kinsolving
William Francis Kirkwood
John Robert Kowall
Theodore De Kruijff
George Marion Kyle
Gorman De Freest Larner
Henry S. Lee
Schuyler Lee (died in service)
Manderson Lehr (died in service)
David Wilbur Lewis
Kenneth Procter Littauer
Ralph Lane Loomis
William Fitch Loomis
Edward Loughran (died in service)
Walter Lovell (Lafayette Escadrille)
W. Leslie Ludlam
Raoul Gervais Lufbery (Lafayette Escadrille, died in service)
Gordon B. Macke
Douglas Macmonagle (Lafayette Escadrille, died in service)
Guy Bertram Magley
Charles Thomas Malone
Harold L. Manierre
Kenneth Archibald Marr (Lafayette Escadrille)
Pierre Didier Masson (Lafayette Escadrille) 
George Archibald McCall
James Rogers McConnell (Lafayette Escadrille, died in service)
James B. McCreary, Jr.
William McGinn
'Lucky' Herschel McKee (1897–1964), McKee made 12 kills to become the youngest Ace
William John McKerness (died in service)
James Haitt McMillen
William Henry Meeker (died in service)
Gordon R. Miles
Alvin Ford Miller
George Miller
Walter Bernard Miller (died in service)
Bennet Arthur Molter
Robert Louis Moore
George Clark Moseley
Oscar Mouvet
Curtis B. Munson
Alan Hammond Nichols (died in service)
Charles Bernard Nordhoff
Nathan Prince Oakes, Jr.
Carter Landram Ovington (died in service)
David Paden
Henry Brewster Palmer (died in service)
Austen Gilette Parker
Edwin Charles Parsons (Lafayette Escadrille) 
Paul Pavelka (Lafayette Escadrille, died in service)
Alfred Digby Pelton (died in service)
David M. Peterson, (Lafayette Escadrille, died in service)
Granville Alexander Pollock
William Ponder
Thomas Windeatt Potter
Frederick Henry Prince, Jr. (Lafayette Escadrille)
Norman Prince (Lafayette Escadrille, died in service)
David Endicott Putnam (died in service)
John Francis Randall
Rufus Randall Rand
Robert Emery Read
Leonard Minor Reno
Walter Davis Rheno (died in service)
Hugh Owen Ridlon
George J. Rockwell, Jr.
Kiffin Yates Rockwell (Lafayette Escadrille, died in service)
Robert Lockerbie Rockwell (Lafayette Escadrille)
Marius Romain Rocle
William Blackstock Rodgers, Jr.
John F. Rolf, Jr.
Clifford De Roode
Raymond Thomas Ross
Kenneth Rotharmel
Leland Lasell Rounds
Laurence Dana Rumsey, Jr. (Lafayette Escadrille)
Joseph Roe Saul
Harold Young Saxon
Lawrence Scanlan
Edwin Booth Schreiber (died in service)
Horace Seaver
Walter John Shaffer
Walter B. Shipley
Clarence Bernard Shoninger (Croix de Guerre recipient)
Reginald Sinclaire
Glenn Nelson Sitterly
Samuel Wiggins Skinner (died in service)
Robert Soubiran (Lafayette Escadrille)
Wallace Speers
Dumaresq Spencer (died in service)
Alfred Holt Stanley
Frank Elmer Starret, Jr. (died in service)
Russell Falconer Stearns
Joseph Charles Stehlin
Henry Elmer Stickney
Donald Edward Stone (died in service)
Gerald Starr Stone
Upton Supple Sullivan
Leslie Ray Taber
William Hallet Tailer (died in service)
Elmer Bowden Taylor (died in service)
Hugh Terres (died in service)
William Thaw (aviator) (Lafayette Escadrille)
Clifton Badlam Thompson
Charles Trinkard (died in service)
Dudley Gilman Tucker (died in service)
George Evans Turnure, Jr.
Stephen Mitchell Tyson (died in service)
Fleet William Carey Van, Jr.
Charles Herbert Veil
Neal Wainwright
Benjamin Stuart Walcott (died in service)
William Ethelbert Van Wass
William A. "Wild Bill" Wellman (1896–1975), Director of "Wings" (the first motion picture to win the Academy Award)
Frank Willard Wells
Herman Kotzchmer Whitmore
John Joyce Whitmore
Charles Herbert Wilcox
Marcellus Edward Wild
George Gale Willard
Harold Buckley Willis (Lafayette Escadrille)
Westel Robinson Willoughby
Joseph Volney Wilson (died in service)
Pierre Marie Wilson
Alan Francis Winslow
Carroll Dana Winslow
Charles Wallace Winter, Jr. (died in service)
Henry Houston Woodward (died in service)
Warwick Worthington
Harold Everett Wright
Walter Raymond York (died in service)
Frederick Wilhelm Zinn
 

The following pilots are not listed as part of the Flying Corps by the Lafayette Escadrille Memorial Foundation.

Gill Robb Wilson

See also

 List of World War I flying aces
 Vintage Aero Flying Museum

References

Lafayette Escadrille
French Air and Space Force squadrons
Military history of France
Aviation in World War I
French expatriate units and formations
Gilbert du Motier, Marquis de Lafayette